The 1968 NCAA College Division basketball tournament involved 36 schools playing in a single-elimination tournament to determine the national champion of men's NCAA College Division college basketball as a culmination of the 1967–68 NCAA College Division men's basketball season. It was won by Kentucky Wesleyan College, with Indiana State's Jerry Newsom named Most Outstanding Player. Uniquely, Indiana State has finished as the National Runner-up in the (1946 and 1948) NAIA Tournaments, the (1979) NCAA Division I Tournament, and the 1968 NCAA Division II Tournament.

Regional participants

*indicates a tie

Regionals

New England

Consolation- Assumption 94, Springfield 75
Consolation- Northeastern 67, Le Moyne 54

South - Jackson, Tennessee
Location: unknown Host: Union University

Third Place - Oglethorpe 82, Bethune-Cookman 70

East - Reading, Pennsylvania
Location: Bollman Center Host: Cheyney State College

Third Place -Philadelphia Textile 105, Muhlenberg 94

Mideast - Ashland, Ohio
Location: Kates Gymnasium Host: Ashland University

Third Place - Denison 90, Roanoke 77

Midwest - Springfield, Missouri
Location: McDonald Hall and Arena Host: Southwest Missouri State University

Third Place - Lincoln 92, Southern Colorado 77

Southwest - Lake Charles, Louisiana
Location: Memorial Gym Host: McNeese State University

Third Place - Jackson State 75, McNeese State 71

Great Lakes - Normal, Illinois
Location: Horton Field House Host: Illinois State University

Third Place - South Dakota State 86, DePauw 84

Pacific Coast - San Diego, California
Location: Peterson Gym Host: San Diego State College

Third Place - San Diego State 79, UC Davis 72

*denotes each overtime played

National Finals - Evansville, Indiana
Location: Roberts Municipal Stadium Host: University of Evansville

Third Place - Trinity 68, Ashland 52

*denotes each overtime played

All-tournament team
 Fred Hardman (Indiana State)
 Larry Jeffries (Trinity (TX))
 Jerry Newsom (Indiana State)
 Dallas Thornton (Kentucky Wesleyan)
 George Tinsley (Kentucky Wesleyan)

See also
 1968 NCAA University Division basketball tournament
 1968 NAIA Basketball Tournament

References

Sources
 2010 NCAA Men's Basketball Championship Tournament Records and Statistics: Division II men's basketball Championship
 1968 NCAA College Division Men's Basketball Tournament jonfmorse.com

NCAA Division II men's basketball tournament
Tournament
NCAA College Division basketball tournament
NCAA College Division basketball tournament